Shawn Thomas, also known by his stage name C-Bo, is an American rapper.

C-Bo, notoriously known for his relationship with law enforcement, was one of the first rappers to be jailed due to his lyrical content, a scathing critique of political officials, including governor Pete Wilson, California's Prop. 184 mandatory 25-life sentences for three strike felons, and police on his track "Deadly Game" written with rapper X-Raided in 1995. He unsuccessfully argued for appeal three times, while gaining nationwide attention for arguably his most successful mainstream album. Although some charges were dropped as it was viewed as a violation of his First Amendment rights, he was arrested in California in 1998, under the suspicion that his violent rap lyrics violated his parole. He rapped his court statement to the presiding judge, in Ohio, who gave C-Bo probation on the condition that he also rap in a Public Service Announcement.

He also notably appeared in the California Love music video.

Early life
Thomas was raised in a single family home amongst three brothers and five sisters,
during that time he became a member in the Garden Blocc Crips.

Legal issues
Since the age of 10 Thomas spent nearly half of his life in and out of incarceration, entering the criminal justice system at age 14, being arrested 40-50 times spending time at Soledad State Prison, Folsom State Prison, and Deuel Vocational Institution.

During a 1993 music video shoot, Thomas fired a shot in the air to get people's attention and stop a potential gang situation. Instead it made matters worse, confusing the crowd and causing more shots to ring off. His friend King Miller was killed at age 23 during the act.

In a 1996 incident Thomas was sentenced to 15 months in jail. A firearm used by him caused a death of one man during a rival gang confrontation.

In March 1998 he was sentenced to two more months in prison in Sacramento, after testing positive for marijuana which violated the terms of his probation.

In August 2017 during the filming of a music video. A shootout occurred leaving 1 dead and 4 injured. This came after rapper Mozzy and Thomas had exchanged diss tracks during the same month.

Personal life

Thomas is married with 3 children, he enjoys skiing, camping and fishing.

Discography

Studio albums

Collaboration albums
Blocc Movement with Brotha Lynch Hung (2001)
Gang Affiliated with West Coast Mafia Gang (2004)
In Thugz We Trust with Thug Lordz (2004)
100 Racks In My Backpack with San Quinn (2006)
Thug Lordz Trilogy with Thug Lordz (2006)
The Moment of Truth with Killa Tay (2006)
Tradin' War Stories with Omar "Big-O" Gooding (2008)
Thug Money with Thug Lordz (2010)

Compilation albums
The Best of C-Bo (1995)
C-Bo's Best Appearances '91-'99 (2001)
West Coast Mafia (2002)
West Side Ryders (2003)
C-Bo's Lost Sessions (2004)
West Side Ryders II (2005)
Best of the Girth (2005)
The Greatest Hits (2005)
West Side Ryders III (2007)
West Coast Classics (2007)
C-Bo's Bulletproof (2007)
West Side Ryders IV: World Wide Mob (2008)
West Side Ryders V (2011)
C-Bo Trilogy (2012)
OG Chronicles (2014)
Mobfather: The John Gotti Pack (2018)

Mixtapes
Underground & Unreleased with West Coast Mafia Gang (2004)
West Coast Durty with Lil' Flip (2004)
The Money to Burn Mixtape (2006)
Cashville Takeover with Cashville Records (2009)
West Coast Mafia Music (2010)
I Am Gangsta Rap (2013)

Extended plays

Singles
"OT Trips" with Brit on the Beat (2022)
"The Hustler" (2022)
"Mo Money" (2022)
"Lets' Ride" with Kafeeno (2022)

Guest appearances

References

See also
 List of EMI artists

Living people
21st-century American male musicians
21st-century American rappers
African-American businesspeople
African-American male rappers
African-American record producers
American hip hop record producers
American male rappers
American music industry executives
Businesspeople from California
Cashville Records artists
Crips
Gangsta rappers
G-funk artists
Rappers from Sacramento, California
Record producers from California
Underground rappers
Virgin Records artists
West Coast hip hop musicians
21st-century African-American musicians
1971 births